Krutoy is a rural locality (a khutor) in Slashchyovskoye Rural Settlement, Kumylzhensky District, Volgograd Oblast, Russia. The population was 47 as of 2010. There are 2 streets.

Geography 
Krutoy is located in forest steppe, on Khopyorsko-Buzulukskaya Plain, on the bank of the Khopyor River, 32 km west of Kumylzhenskaya (the district's administrative centre) by road. Slashchevskaya is the nearest rural locality.

References 

Rural localities in Kumylzhensky District